Proviverridae ("before civets") is a family of extinct predatory mammals from extinct superfamily Hyaenodontoidea within extinct order Hyaenodonta. Fossil remains of these mammals are known from early to late Eocene deposits in Europe.

Classification and phylogeny

Taxonomy
 Family: †Proviverridae 
 Genus: †Minimovellentodon 
 †Minimovellentodon russelli 
 Genus: †Morlodon 
 †Morlodon vellerei 
 Genus: †Parvagula 
 †Parvagula palulae 
 (unranked): †Allopterodon/Proviverra clade
 Genus: †Allopterodon 
 †Allopterodon bulbosus 
 †Allopterodon minor 
 †Allopterodon torvidus 
 Genus: †Lesmesodon 
 †Lesmesodon behnkeae 
 †Lesmesodon edingeri 
 †Lesmesodon gunnelli 
 Genus: †Proviverra 
 †Proviverra typica

Phylogeny 
The phylogenetic relationships of family Proviverridae are shown in the following cladogram:

See also
 Mammal classification
 Hyaenodontoidea

References

Hyaenodonts
Paleogene mammals of Europe
Prehistoric mammal families